KDNE (91.9 FM) is a radio station  broadcasting an Indie format. Licensed in Crete, Nebraska, United States. The station is currently owned by the Doane University Board of Trustees.

References

External links

Listen to KDNE online

DNE